Nick Sidi (born 22 February 1966) is an English actor. He is the husband of Marianne Elliott and son-in-law of actress Rosalind Knight. He often plays drama or comedy roles on television and frequently appears in BBC dramas.

Filmography

Theatre

References

External links 

Male actors from Manchester
1966 births
Living people
English people of Turkish descent
21st-century English male actors
English male film actors
English male television actors
English male stage actors